Yangji was a village in the Yuexiu District of Guangzhou City, Guangdong Province, China, which was demolished in 2010 and is now planned to be rebuilt as a 'new community'.

Demolition 
As the city of Guangzhou developed, Yangji was surrounded by newly built skyscrapers in Zhujiang New Town and Wuyang New Town and became incompatible with them with frequent cases of robbery and theft reported in the village . As a result, plans were made for its demolition in 2010. This started on July1 of that year.

Transportation 
Guangzhou Metro:  Yangji Station

References

External links 
Photos documenting the forced demolition of Yangji Village: https://www.flickr.com/photos/kaletaylorphotography/sets/72157627673627564/

Yuexiu District
Former villages in China